Leonard John Brake (born 3 July 1952) is a former New Zealand rugby union player and coach. A first five-eighth, Brake represented Bay of Plenty at a provincial level, and was a member of the New Zealand national side, the All Blacks, on their 1976 tour of South America. He played five matches on that tour, but did not appear in either of the unofficial tests against Argentina. He went on to be the Bay of Plenty selector–coach between 1989 and 1991.

References

1952 births
Living people
Rugby union players from Rotorua
People educated at Western Heights High School
New Zealand rugby union players
New Zealand international rugby union players
Bay of Plenty rugby union players
Rugby union fly-halves
New Zealand rugby union coaches